The Cassidini are a tribe within the leaf beetle subfamily Cassidinae.  The Cassidini comprises approximately 40 genera worldwide, and is one of the largest tribes in the subfamily, containing most of the genera and species known collectively as "tortoise beetles". The subfamily names Cassidinae and Hispinae were both founded by Gyllenhal in the same 1813 book, but following the Principle of the First Reviser, Chen in this case, priority is given to the name Cassidinae.

Genera

References

External links
 
 
 Interactive key to the Cassidini

Polyphaga tribes
Cassidinae
Taxa named by Leonard Gyllenhaal